Kalrud (also Romanized as Kalrūd) is a village in Siyarastaq Yeylaq Rural District, Rahimabad District, Rudsar County, Gilan Province, Iran. At the 2006 census, its population was 94, in 26 families.

References 

Populated places in Rudsar County